Anya is a feminine given name.

Anya may also refer to:

Places and jurisdictions 
 Anya, the modern site in Asian Turkey of Anæa, an Ancient city, former bishopric and present Latin Catholic titular see
 Ara Gaya or Anya, a former kingdom in Korea

People  
 Anya (wrestler) or Anna Bogomazova, professional wrestler for WWE 
 Ikechi Anya, Scottish footballer

Art, entertainment, and media

Fictional entities
 Anya (Anastasia), the title character of the 1997 animated film Anastasia
 Anya (Star Trek), a character in the Star Trek: The Next Generation episode "The Dauphin"
Anya, the Grounders' leader in The 100 TV series

Works
 Anya (musical), a 1965 Broadway musical
 Anya (2019 film), a science fiction film
 Anya (2022 film), an Indian crime film
 "Anya", a 1993 song by Deep Purple from The Battle Rages On

Other uses
 Anya potato, a variety of potato

See also 
 Ania (disambiguation)
 Enya (disambiguation)